Korea–Russia relations may refer to bilateral foreign relations between the Russian Federation and the two Korean states:

North Korea–Russia relations
Russia–South Korea relations